Kamenný Most (English: Stone Bridge) is name of several locations:
 Kamenný Most (Kladno District), a village and municipality in the Czech Republic
 Kamenný Most (Nové Zámky District), a village and municipality in Slovakia
 Charles Bridge, a historic bridge in Prague, Czech Republic, once sometimes known as Kamenný most

See also
Bolshoy Kamenny Bridge